Allan Arthur Pearse (22 April 1915 – 14 June 1981) played first-class cricket for Somerset in nine matches between 1936 and 1938. He was born and died at Watchet, Somerset.

Pearse was a middle-order right-handed batsman whose club cricket was for Watchet Cricket Club, where Harold Gimblett was his contemporary. As a 16-year-old, playing for Watchet against Wellington Cricket Club, he joined Gimblett with the Watchet score at 37 for seven chasing a total of 160. The pair added the 123 runs needed, Gimblett scoring 91 and Pearse 33. Pearse followed Gimblett into the Somerset side, making his debut in 1936 at the Agricultural Showgrounds, Frome, the same ground where Gimblett had made his sensational debut a year earlier. In his first innings he scored 20, which was the second highest of the Somerset innings against Kent. But in five other first-class matches in the 1936 season he failed to score more than 10 in any innings, and in two matches in 1937 he also made little impression. His last first-class game in 1938 saw him batting at No 10 and failing to score in either innings.

References

1915 births
1981 deaths
English cricketers
Somerset cricketers
People from Watchet